Florence E. "Flo" Sundstrom (February 9, 1918 – June 25, 2001) was an American actress who had an active career in theatre, television, and film. A prominent character actress on Broadway from 1936-1959, she notably created the roles of  Bella in the world premiere of Anita Loos's Happy Birthday in 1946, Bessie in the world premiere of Tennessee Williams's The Rose Tattoo in 1951, and Mrs. Marie "Fatty" Pert in Ketti Frings's Look Homeward, Angel in 1957. She made her film debut as Flora in the film adaptation of The Rose Tattoo in 1955, and thereafter remained active as a character actress in American television and film into the 1990s. She was a main cast member in the 1955–1956 season of The Life of Riley, portraying a new neighbor of the Riley family.

Life and career
Florence E. Sundstrom was born February 9, 1918, in New York City, the younger of two daughters of U.S. Navy Captain Einar William Sundstrom and Jetta Marie (Osmundsen) Sundstrom. She was educated at Great Neck High School, and studied acting, music, and dance in New York and Galveston, Texas, where she made her stage debut in 1922. 

She made her Broadway debut as a replacement in Parnell during its 1935–1936 run at the Ethel Barrymore Theatre, and was an opening cast member as Vivian Caldwell in Henry R. Misrock's Bright Honor at the 48th Street Theatre (September 27, 1936). She starred as a character actress in numerous plays on Broadway through 1959, including Chester Erskine's The Good (Oct 1938, as Rose Dubrowski), Irwin Shaw's Retreat to Pleasure (1940 -1941, as Lenore Trilling), Charles MacArthur's Johnny on a Spot (1942, as Barbara Webster), Frank Tarloff's They Should Have Stood in Bed (1942, as Vivian Lowe), Milton Lazarus's The Sun Field (1942, as Karyl Dumont), Robert Stolz's Mr. Strauss Goes to Boston (1945, as Pepi), Stanley Richards's Marriage Is for Single People (1945, as Lily Packer), Anita Loos's Happy Birthday (1946-1948, as Bella), Fay Kanin's Goodbye, My Fancy (1948-1949, as Ellen Griswold), Tennessee Williams's The Rose Tattoo (1951, as Bessie), Mary Helen Fay's Faithfully Yours (1951, as Gracie), N. Richard Nash's See the Jaguar (1952, as Mrs. Meeker), and Ketti Frings's Look Homeward, Angel (1957-1959, as Mrs. Marie "Fatty" Pert).

In film Sundstrom appeared in The Rose Tattoo (1955, as Flora, The Vagabond King (1956, as Laughing Margot), Spring Reunion (1957, as Mary), Bachelor in Paradise (1961, as Mrs. Pickering),  The Last Challenge (1967, as Outdoors), The World's Greatest Lover (1977,  as Aunt Tillie), Stitches (1985, as a maid), and Pacific Heights (1990, as Mrs. Thayer).

Sundstrom joined the main cast of the television series The Life of Riley for the 1955-1956 season after the Riley family moved and they were given new neighbors portrayed by  Sundstrom and George O'Hanlon.

Sundstorm married baritone and musical theatre actor and radio personality Ronald Graham on December 20, 1940, who died in 1950, aged 38.
Sundstorm died in Los Angeles on June 25, 2001, at the age of 83.

Filmography

Film

Television

References

External links 
 
 
 
 Florence Sundstrom theatre credits on BroadwayWorld

1918 births
2001 deaths
20th-century American actresses
American musical theatre actresses
American television actresses